Steward Ceus (born March 26, 1987 in West Haverstraw, New York) is a Haitian footballer who most recently played as a goalkeeper for New York Cosmos in the National Independent Soccer Association.

Career

Youth and college
Ceus attended North Rockland High School, where he lettered in soccer all four years (as well as tennis for three years and basketball), posted a county and school-record 36 career shutouts as a junior, earned all-league laurels all four years, all-section accolades three times and all-county honors on two occasions.

He played four years of college soccer at the University at Albany, where he was named to the America East Commissioner's Honor Roll and ranked second in America East with 66 saves as a freshman, made the America East All-Academic Team and was named to the America East Commissioner's Academic Honor Roll as a sophomore, and garnered America East All-Academic Team honors as a junior in 2007.

Professional
Ceus was drafted in the third round (37th overall) of the 2009 MLS SuperDraft by the Colorado Rapids. However, he did play in the 2nd half of the Community Shield against the Sounders at CenturyLink Field. The Rapids lost 3–1. Ceus let in two goals.

He was loaned to the Charlotte Eagles of the USL Second Division in June 2009, to gain experience and maintain fitness levels; he made his debut for them on June 20, 2009, in a game against Richmond Kickers. He renewed this loan with the Eagles in March 2010.

Ceus was released by Colorado on December 6, 2013 after five seasons with the club. On March 21, 2014 he arrived in Finland to try out for the Finnish club Närpes Kraft Fotbollsförening for the starting goalkeeper position. On April 11, he signed a one-year contract.

On January 14, 2015, Ceus returned to the United States, signing with NASL club Atlanta Silverbacks.

International 
Ceus made his debut for Haiti in 2010.

References

External links
 
 University at Albany bio
 

1987 births
Living people
American soccer players
Haitian footballers
African-American soccer players
American sportspeople of Haitian descent
Citizens of Haiti through descent
Haiti international footballers
Albany Great Danes men's soccer players
Colorado Rapids players
Charlotte Eagles players
Närpes Kraft Fotbollsförening players
Atlanta Silverbacks players
Minnesota United FC (2010–2016) players
San Francisco Deltas players
Colorado Springs Switchbacks FC players
Soccer players from New York (state)
USL Second Division players
Major League Soccer players
North American Soccer League players
Colorado Rapids draft picks
2015 CONCACAF Gold Cup players
Copa América Centenario players
Association football goalkeepers
21st-century African-American sportspeople
20th-century African-American people